Valentino Baldi (1774 – October 22, 1816) was an Italian painter, mainly of quadratura and ornamentation in fresco and tempera.

Biography
Born in Pistoia, he was the son of Raffaello Baldi, and trained under Francesco Beneforti (1715-1802) in Pistoia. There he was a student along with Baronto Tolemei. He then moved to Bologna where he worked under Mauro Tesi. After Tesi died, Baldi received patronage in Bologna from the Senator Girolamo Ranuzzi, the Count Massimiliano Gini, and lastly the Signore Biagio Bugamelli. He profited from making copies of still-life paintings.

References

1774 births
1816 deaths
People from Pistoia
18th-century Italian painters
Italian male painters
19th-century Italian painters
Painters from Tuscany
Painters from Bologna
19th-century Italian male artists
18th-century Italian male artists